Pick of the Week may refer to:

 Pick of the Week (radio), a British BBC radio programme broadcast from 1959
 Pick of the Week (TV series), a Canadian television series broadcast 1967–1969

See also
 Pick of the Pops, a BBC radio programme broadcast from 1955